Ovanåker Municipality (Ovanåkers kommun) is a municipality in Gävleborg County, east central Sweden. The municipal seat is located in Edsbyn.

The subdivision reform of 1952 saw the amalgamation of "old" Ovanåker with Voxna (both formed by the first local government acts of 1862). In 1977 Alfta (which 1974-1976 had been in Bollnäs Municipality) was added.

Localities 
 Alfta
 Edsbyn (seat)
 Knåda
 Ovanåker
 Roteberg
 Runemo
 Viksjöfors

References

External links 
 
Ovanåker - Official site

Municipalities of Gävleborg County